Luminița Dinu (née Huțupan; born 6 November 1971 in Piatra Neamț) is a Romanian handball player. She is considered a handball legend in Romania. She received a silver medal at the 2005 World Championship and was named goalkeeper of the All-Star Team.

In January 2011, Dinu was chosen the best female goalkeeper ever in a fans' poll carried out by the International Handball Federation by collecting more than 7000 votes (nearly 94%).

For her services to the team and the city, and her exemplary sportsmanship conduct, Dinu was made Honorary Citizen of Râmnicu Vâlcea in 2010. She was also given the award of Cetățean de onoare ("Honorary Citizen") of Neamț County in 2009.

Biography

Dinu-Huțupan, who began playing handball in 1985, has a high school diploma, is married, and speaks Romanian and Slovene. She has also played for HC Kometal Gjorče Petrov and Krim Ljubljana.

Achievements

Club
 3 times winner of Ch. League Cup (2001, 2002, 2003)
 2 times winner of European Super Cup (2004, 2007)
 5 times winner of Romanian First League of Women's Handball
 6 times winner of Slovenian Championship
 4 times winner of Romanian Cup
 6 times winner of Slovenian Cup
 Winner of Romanian SuperCup - 1st Edition
 Winner of Cup Winners'Cup (2007)
 Winner of Champions Trophy - 1st Edition

National Team
 2nd place 2005 World Women's Handball Championship

Individual
 Romanian Handballer of the Year: 2006, 2007, 2008
 Best Goalkeeper of 2000 European Women's Handball Championship
 Best Goalkeeper of 2005 World Women's Handball Championship
 Best Goalkeeper of 2007 EHF Women's Champions Trophy
 Most Valuable Player of 2005 World Women's Handball Championship
 Best Goalkeeper Ever – fans' poll

Notes and references

External links
 Official website

1971 births
Living people
Romanian female handball players
Sportspeople from Piatra Neamț
Handball players at the 2000 Summer Olympics
Handball players at the 2008 Summer Olympics
Olympic handball players of Romania
Expatriate handball players
Romanian expatriate sportspeople in North Macedonia
Romanian expatriate sportspeople in Slovenia